The Dorroh-Trent House, at 11th and Conley Streets in Hammon, Oklahoma, was built in 1910.  It was listed on the National Register of Historic Places in 1979.

It is a wood-frame construction building, apparently deemed significant for association with Dr. Lee Dorrah, who was in 1910 "appointed physician for the Red Moon Indian Agency and from that time on was a vigorous champion of the Cheyenne and Arapaho
peoples and a vocal advocate for their rights. He was appointed local surgeon for the Clinton, Oklahoma and Western Railway Company."

References

National Register of Historic Places in Roger Mills County, Oklahoma
Houses completed in 1910